Donald Challis (born 26 June 1929) is a British sound and dubbing editor for many critically acclaimed films, including The Three Musketeers (1973 live-action film), A Taste of Honey (film) and Help! (film). His most famous contribution was to Oh! What a Lovely War as the sound editor, winning him a BAFTA Film Award alongside Simon Kaye for Best Film Soundtrack in 1970.

Biography 
Don Challis was born in Tottenham, England. His career started at the age of 19 in 1948 at the Pinewood Studios in Buckinghamshire, England, with the Crown Film Unit as an apprentice assistant film editor, the studios having been commandeered by the government for making propaganda films for the Ministry of Information. His Association of Cine Technicians Union membership number was 8708.

He spent some time at Beaconsfield Studios, Merton Park Studios and Countryman Films in Soho Square, London.

In 1969, he took the role of sound editor for the hit musical film Oh! What a Lovely War which went down as a huge success, winning five BAFTA Film Awards in 1970, one of which going to himself and his partner Simon Kaye (who was the sound mixer for the film) for the Best Soundtrack. This huge success led him to being in the sound editing department for a range of horror and drama films including Tam-Lin (film) in 1970, Blue Blood (1973 film) and I Don't Want to Be Born in 1975. More so, the success gave him the opportunity to be the sound editor for the award-winning adaptations of The Three Musketeers (1973 live-action film) and The Four Musketeers in 1974.

In 1971, Challis became the sound editor for the award-winning film adaptation of Fiddler on the Roof. However he fell ill during the production of the film so his role was taken over by Les Wiggins, a sound editor from Middlesex, England. This resulted in Wiggins being credited sound editor, leaving Don Challis uncredited despite his contribution.

Challis' last contribution to the sound department of the film industry was in 1976 with Emily (film). Then, at the end of the same year, he moved from his home in Hertfordshire, England, to Essex with his wife and two daughters. Marking the move as the end of his career in the sound editing department, he settled for the ownership of a small post office.

Filmography 

Credited roles 

Uncredited roles 

[**] role taken over by Les Wiggins (credited)

References

External links
 

1929 births
Living people
Best Sound BAFTA Award winners
People from Tottenham